Montaigne Visiting Torquato Tasso in Prison (French - Le Tasse en prison visité par Montaigne or Le Tasse et Montaigne) is an 1821 oil on canvas painting by Fleury François Richard, acquired in 1822 by the Museum of Fine Arts of Lyon at the request of baron Rambaud, mayor of Lyon. It was first exhibited at the Paris Salon of 1822. It is one of the artist's last paintings, showing Torquato Tasso being visited by Montaigne while in prison.

Sources
M. Stuffmann, N. Miller, K. Stierle, Eugène Delacroix, Reflections : Tasso In the Madhouse, 2008.

1821 paintings
History paintings
Paintings by Fleury François Richard
Paintings in the collection of the Museum of Fine Arts of Lyon
Cultural depictions of Michel de Montaigne
Torquato Tasso